Viersen is a Kreis (district) in the west of North Rhine-Westphalia, Germany. Neighboring districts are Cleves, Wesel, district-free Krefeld, Neuss, district-free Mönchengladbach, Heinsberg and the Dutch province of Limburg.

History

In 1816, the new Prussian government created the district of Kempen. Originally belonging to the Regierungsbezirk Kleve which was dissolved in 1822, Kempen has since then belonged to Düsseldorf. In 1929 the district was enlarged significantly and renamed Kempen-Krefeld.

In 1975 the district again changed its borders and was renamed Viersen even though Kempen remained the capital. Viersen city replaced Kempen as the capital in 1984.

Twin Cities

The district Viersen has been twinned with Cambridgeshire in the United Kingdom since 1983.

Geography
The district is located in the lowlands between the rivers Rhine and Meuse. The highest elevation is at Süchtelner Höhen with 

Coat of arms
The top of the coat of arms shows the black cross of the Cologne bishops, as the district used to belong to the clerical state Cologne. The golden lion on blue ground is the symbol of the duchy of Guelders; the black lion on golden ground the symbol of the duchy of Jülich.

Cities and municipalities

based on data from: 31. December 2005>

References

External links

Official website (German)

 
Districts of North Rhine-Westphalia